The Monti Sabini is a mountain range in the Apennines of Latium, central Italy.

It is located in a North-South direction between the Monti Reatini at the east and the Tiber valley at the west. The upper section is the Monti Sabini proper, on the boundary between Latium and Umbria, and the Monti Lucretili sub-range, on the boundary between the province of Rieta and the Metropolitan City of Rome. The two sub-ranges are separated by the plain and hilly areas of the Sabina.

 

Sabini
Mountain ranges of Italy
Sabini